Sacred Heart College, also known as Marist Brothers Rosalie, was a Catholic boys' college located in Paddington, an inner western suburb of Brisbane, Queensland, Australia. The college had been a high school for students in grades 8 to 12, but was closed at the end of 2008. Some of the school buildings were heritage-listed on the Queensland Heritage Register in 2008.

Grounds and campus

There is a monastery (now the “Brothers House”) located at 56 Fernberg Road which was built in 1929 (architect: George Frederick Addison). The building is rectangular in plan with a continuous veranda integrated into unconventional orders supporting the veranda roof over two-storeys. Capitalising on the sloping terrain of the site, this large masonry structure is elevated from street level so as to emphasise grandeur. A low, retaining wall edges the property to the street.

The main college is located at 58 Fernberg Road and was built in 1949 (architect: Frank L. Cullen). The college building is a three-storey brick construction, containing 9 classrooms and an attached undercroft recreational area. The classrooms are accessed by an internal wooden staircase and long hallways.

Additional college buildings surrounding the main structure include science laboratories, a library, workshops and a swimming pool. The college grounds are terraced from the Fernberg Road level down to Beck Street; this area includes playgrounds, cricket nets and tennis courts.

Another wing of the college is located across the road at 61 Fernberg Road having been built in 1971. This is a long, two-level building with eight classrooms and facilities including an art room, a playground and covered area.

The fields cover  and have 4 playing fields and other facilities.

The current school site (and the Brothers’ Monastery) are owned, in principle, by the Corporation of the Trustees of the Roman Catholic Archdiocese of Brisbane (beneficially for the local parish) and zoned by the Brisbane City Council for community and education purposes. The school is presently administered by Brisbane Catholic Education and supported by the Marist Brothers (who currently supply a principal and two members of staff). The playing fields at Fig Tree Pocket are owned in trust by the Marist Brothers for the Rosalie college.

The Catholic Church often created ownership of land and buildings on trust for the local parish in part in recognition of the fact that the parish and the community supplied money, time and labour to create the facilities. At Marist Rosalie College the Marist Brothers administered and taught at the school until 1970 when Catholic Education Brisbane took over the administration. Despite the fact that Catholic Education Brisbane and the Marist Brothers do not own the school or land they are influential in the direction the school takes, as is, traditionally, the Parish priest, who acts as a voice for the local Catholic community.

Adjacent to the school are a number of Catholic buildings still owned by the Parish. At 369 Given Terrace stands the large red brick Sacred Heart Church, built in 1917. Immediately across the road at 333 Given Terrace is the "Sacred Heart Primary School" (consisting of 5 small buildings) for grades 1–7, now closed but used by other Catholic groups. Behind that is a brick community hall constructed in 1978. There is also a parish priest residence on Given Terrace and a smaller building on the corner of Fernberg Road and Given Terrace that stands where the parish’s original wooden church stood. The original wooden church was constructed and formally blessed by Archbishop Robert Dunne on 10 March 1907 and was used until the large brick church was built in 1917, and thereafter it was used for primary school schooling until it burnt down in the 1970s. Finally at 327 Given Terrace there is the Sacred Heart Convent built in 1918 which was owned and used by the Sisters of Mercy order of nuns (who had commenced teaching in the parish in 1905) until sold by them in 2005. All of these premises have been utilised by the Marist Brothers High School when the need arises.

Location and demographics
Marist Brothers Rosalie is located in the area known as Rosalie, which is a small locality within Paddington, an inner western suburb of the city of Brisbane. The ground in that locality is full of slopes and hills with the high points being held by the Catholic Church or the Queensland Government.

Marist College Rosalie is geographically placed at the centre of the suburbs of Paddington, Milton, Bardon, Red Hill and Petrie Terrace. These suburbs were traditionally working-class mainly made of old Anglo-Irish Catholic Australians, indigenous aboriginal people and new waves of Catholics migrants. The first Catholic migrants were the Irish, then the Italians, Croatians and Polish came in the 1950s, 1960s and 1970s and then more recently smaller groups of Islander, South American and South East Asian families.

The high proportion of Catholics in the area during those years is attested to by the fact that there are seven Catholic churches, four primary Catholic schools (one defunct), two girls high schools, and various halls and refectories all within a 2km (1.3m) radius of Marist Brothers Rosalie.

These “new” communities were both fortified and nurtured by the local churches and their schools and many families made financial sacrifices to support these institutions.

Today the sons of immigrant families are a continuing presence at Marist College Rosalie, reflecting the multicultural population of Brisbane and the mix of Australian-Irish, Anglo-Irish, European, Asian and Latin at the school reflects the Catholic Church in a microcosm.

Traditionally the school drew from this local population for its students, however, since the 1960s and especially since the gentrification of the Paddington area in the 1980s and 1990s with young professionals, the school has drawn mainly from Catholic families on the western train line, and to a lesser extent from the northern suburbs of Kelvin Grove, Ashgrove, The Gap, Herston, Normanby and Windsor.

The suburbs traversed by the western line run from the now gentrified formerly working-class inner west, through the middle-class western suburbs to the now largely working-class outer western suburbs.

The train line passes through the suburbs of Milton, Auchenflower, Toowong, Taringa, Indooroopilly, Chelmer, Graceville, Sherwood, Corinda, Oxley, Darra, Wacol and onto Ipswich.

The train line at Indooroopilly also links with buses from the non-train accessible western suburbs of Kenmore, Chapel Hill, Pinjarra Hills, Pullevale, Brookfield, Mt Ommaney, Jindalee, and Riverhills who also access the major Western Freeway for motorcars which exits onto Milton Road at Toowong before passing through Milton onto the city heart.

Accordingly, Marist Brothers Rosalie is well-positioned to attract students from the western suburbs and is, in fact, the only Catholic high school for boys in the western suburbs of Brisbane between the city of Brisbane and the city of Ipswich. The only other non-State run high schools in the western suburbs that take boys are Brisbane Boys College (Protestant) and St Peter’s (co-ed Lutheran).

Today the western “train line” students make up some 70% of the school's population. Recent Queensland Government demographics (2007) however suggest that although the local children attending Rosalie dropped off as the area went through a process of gentrification, and became an area for young people and singles, the area now is once again becoming a family area as those “young people and singles” marry and have children. Accordingly, those demographics have indicated that there is a mini "baby boom" locally, which the school can draw from.

History
Marist Brothers Rosalie represents an enduring example of the history of Catholic Education in Queensland, and stands as a testament to the influence and foresight of the great Catholic “architect” and “builder” of Brisbane, Archbishop James Duhig. In 1912 Archbishop Duhig was made adjudicator of Brisbane and then Archbishop of Brisbane in 1917. He instigated a period of great expansion in the Catholic Church resulting in the building and rebuilding of churches, schools and convents that lasted well into until the 1940s. What makes the Archbishop’s vision even more impressive is that the expansion occurred during the financially difficult time of the Great Depression and during uncertain times of World War One and World War Two when young men were at war and construction material and labour was difficult to obtain. The hills across Brisbane are dotted with Catholic education buildings built on land purchased by the Archbishop during this period as part of his vision for the future. As Archbishop of Brisbane for fifty years, he oversaw the construction of more than four hundred major church buildings.

At the same time as Duhig's "construction" the Marist order was invited (although the Marists taught at as far back as 1919 in the Rosalie parish), as were the Brigidine Sisters, Christian Brothers, and Josephite nuns to educate the Catholic families of Brisbane in these new buildings, and they became an integral part of Queensland's religious cultural history.

In line with Archbishop Duhig’s vision the Rosalie monastery was the Marist Order's first house in Queensland and the foundation stone of the Marist Brothers' Monastery was officially laid on 29 July 1928 by His Excellency B. Catteneo. The construction was completed and ready for the new school year and was officially opened on 20 February 1929 by Archbishop Duhig. One hundred and thirty-five students were enrolled, a large number coming from the Convent School at Rosalie. The monastery was also used as a boarding residence until 1940.

Those responsible for the design of the monastery were George Frederick Addison, son of prominent architect George Henry Male Addison, and G. F. Macdonald. After his father's death in 1922, the majority of Addison's work would be residential. He designed over thirty homes before his retirement in 1938. In designing the Marist Brothers Monastery, G.F. Addison was continuing a family connection with the Catholic Church as his father's last commission had been the neighbouring church of the Sacred Heart at Rosalie in 1918. G.H.M. Addison designed several other ecclesiastical buildings for the Catholic Church including: the Coorparoo Presbytery (1914); St. Columba's Church, Wilston (1915); St. Benedict's Church, East Brisbane (1917) and the Church of the Little Flower, Kedron (1924). This site stands as a purpose-built, landmark religious structure in Brisbane's Catholic Archdiocese. Its aesthetic significance and association with Brisbane architect, George Frederick Addison, who was continuing the connection of his father, G.H.M. Addison, to the Catholic Church, is a legacy that has been recognised in need of protection and preservation by the Queensland government "heritage listing" process.

Eventually, modern school buildings were constructed, and the Monastery became primarily a residence for the teaching brothers of Marist College, Rosalie. It continues in this function today, as well as being a meeting place for parents and students of the College. It is a landmark structure in Rosalie's residential and Catholic precinct.

Marist Brothers Rosalie took some boarders during the 1930s but this ceased with the opening of Marist College Ashgrove in 1940. By 1939 the Marist College Rosalie roll was four hundred and fifty-one students. It was clear that a new college was necessary. Again under the guiding hand and vision of Archbishop Duhig plans were put in place for a new school building.

The present senior college was officially blessed and opened by Archbishop Duhig on 2 October 1949 at a cost of 35,000 pounds. A crowd of nearly two thousand people attended the opening including the Labor Premier (a staunch Catholic and local resident), Ned Hanlon and the Works Minister, Mr. William Power. Another one of the official guests caused quite a stir at the time. Present at the laying of the foundation stone was Irish hero, revolutionary, president of Sien Fein, Taoiseach (Prime Minister) of Ireland (from 1932–1948, 1951–1954 and 1957–1959) and future President of Ireland (for two seven-year terms from 1959–1973), Éamon de Valera. Mr de Valera was travelling around Australia, at the invitation of a bishop, to speak and associate with the many Irish immigrants who had made Australia their home. At the ceremony at Rosalie, Mr de Valera said, according to press reports at the time, that “...the new school was part of the evidence of the magnificent works of charity and community effort that he had seen in every capital of the Commonwealth.”

It was at this time that Archbishop Duhig’s vision was finally fulfilled, that is schooling of Catholic boys from grade 1 to grade 12. As the school grew further building projects that were funded by the Parents and Friends Association including the building of the swimming pool (1965), the science block (1969) and the library block (1975).

In 1955 the school acquired  of bushland in the suburb of Fig Tree Pocket, in Brisbane’s west and rechristened the land “Lavalla”. Luton White, owner of a chain of garages, sold his land cheaply to the Marist Brothers and the parish at the time on the basis that it be used by the students of Rosalie College for their sports. The visionary Principal, Brother Cyprian Dowd (1935–41, 1953–59), grabbed this opportunity. Brother Cyprian, by all accounts, was a tireless worker and he “marshalled the troops" and over a six-month period the scrub was cleared by parents, old boys, students, members of the parish and a horse (named Dolly) to create four new sports ovals. The grounds were officially opened on 16 October 1955 by Monsignor Steele.

The school continued to grow and a Junior College (61 Fernberg Rd) for grades 4–7 was constructed in 1971 at a cost of A$142000. Archbishop Patrick Mary O'Donnell formally blessed the building on 6 June 1971.

All of these buildings have been refurbished in recent years and the Parents & Friends Association has overseen the construction of tennis courts, cricket practice wickets, basketball courts and a covered assembly area.

Although the school was built by (and largely funded by) the people of Rosalie and the surrounding parishes, in 1970 the school became an Archdiocesan College and under the control of the Brisbane Catholic Education office. In accordance to Catholic canon law this can occur only if there is no parish priest residing in the area as was the case then for a short time. That is its administration was no longer done in the community but externally at the central offices of Brisbane Catholic Education. Subsequently, Father Dennis Power, was assigned the parish however administration was not returned to the Parish. Father Power, worked tirelessly in promoting the school as well as the primary school, the Sacred Heart Convent, adjacent to the school, until his retirement in the 1990s.

At its peak, in the mid-1970s, the school (which also had junior years 4–7) had about 550 children enrolled.

Controversially, at the time, Brisbane Catholic Education decided to close the Junior College (61 Fernberg Rd) down in 1979 and it became part of the Senior College in 1980. The decision was controversial as there was no reason given for the closure except that the adjacent convent, Sacred Heart Convent, which catered for children from grades 1 – 7 was losing boys to the junior school in grade 4, meaning that the grades 4 – 7 at the convent were almost exclusively female even though the school was co-educational. This was deemed not to be in the best interests of the convent. The controversy was fuelled further by Brisbane Catholic Education’s decision to then abruptly close Sacred Heart Convent down in 1995. Unfortunately this decision to close the Junior College ( and the convent) affected the high school as it had lost its “feeder” school, a decision which was to haunt it later.

On 9 March 1989 Pope John Paul II paternally imparted a Special Apostolic Blessing as a pledge of continued divine protection on the school on the occasion of its Diamond Jubilee.

In 2000 Rosalie parish became part of cluster of three parishes with the surrounding suburbs of Red Hill and Bardon, and finally in 2005 the new larger parish was christened the Jubilee Catholic Community.

From the start of the school and in line with the Marist philosophy and to promote Catholic education amongst the working class the school fees were kept at an “affordable” rate. Accordingly, Marist College Rosalie has produced a colourful array of old boys.

Recent history
The school suffered a further blow when on 13 July 2006 Archbishop Bathersby of Brisbane, acting under advice from Brisbane Catholic Education, made the decision to close Marist College Rosalie, with the last class going through in 2008.

There was an outcry from parents, old boys and the community in general. There was substantial local media coverage of the parent’s reactions in relation to availability of placements for their boys in Catholic high schools. There was also concern from the wider Catholic community regarding the closure of a number of schools under Archbishop Bathersby.

The concerns included reservations about an increasingly bureaucratic church run by ex-brothers and nuns who are out of touch with the community and the numbers of Catholic boys that would be thrown onto the State schooling system at a time when secularism is increasing hold in a once large Catholic community. Philosophic concerns were also raised regarding the place of “economic rationalism” in Catholicism and Catholic schooling. Brisbane Catholic Education defended its advice to Archbishop Bathersby by saying that the school was not viable in its current position and that school-age students of the Catholic faith in its catchments area were decreasing.

Opponents of the school's closure say that Brisbane Catholic Education based its decision to close the college due to declining student numbers on outdated demographic figures from 2001 and ignored the findings of its own marketing research report which indicated that appropriate marketing strategies would guarantee a viable future. They were vocal in their criticism of Brisbane Catholic Education by citing official government figures and referring to poor work practices and managerial incompetence within Brisbane Catholic Education as the real reason for the school's misfortune.

Still other opponents of the school's closure referred to hidden agendas in relation to the land the school and its sport fields sit on.

Subsequent to the announcement a group of old boys, business leaders, parents, and concerned Catholics calling itself "Save Rosa" formed the "Rosalie College Interim Board" and have lobbied to keep the school open or open another Catholic School on the site. The group has been successful in gaining official support from local and Queensland State politicians, local businesses and the community as well as behind the scene support from Catholic Orders, Catholic priests and senior public servants. The group, headed by high-profile businessman Barry Maranta approached the Brisbane Archdiocese with a business plan and approved curriculum but their offer was rejected without explanation. The group has vowed to keep working towards a solution that results in a school at the site.

It remains to be seen what will come of the school but concerns have been published in the local media regarding the fact that all of the Catholic high schools in the vicinity are at capacity and have started to refuse Catholic boys admission. Apparently this has led to a crisis which is eroding the faith in the Catholic Church administration, especially given that members of the Archdiocese are complaining that the Archbishop is either not responding or not seeing letters addressed to him regarding the problem.

The school closed on 30 November 2008. In January 2009 the campus became the Lavalla Centre and is used by the Marist Brothers for teacher in-service training and retreats. The local Catholic parish organises youth activities on the site.

Sporting tradition
The college offers a wide variety of sports including soccer, rugby union, cricket, swimming, track and field, basketball, netball, cross-country, water polo, chess, volleyball and tennis.

In the past the college had participated actively and won awards in boxing and rugby league (for many years the school fielded a team in the AMCO and Commonwealth Bank Cups).

Boxing was introduced as a major sporting activity as early as 1931 and continued into the mid-1950s and the school had many state and national champions over that time.

The school won the following premierships:

 Rugby League (Premiership) - 1939 (the very first Rugby League premiership in the competition)
 Rugby - TAS 1sts Blue Division Premiers 2001(joint with St Columban's College), TAS 1sts Red Division premiers 2006, 1987
 Tennis (1st IV Premierships) - 1952, 1966, 1967
 Cricket (XI Premierships) - 1936, 1937, 1938, 1940, 1943, 1944, 1947, 1956, 1960, 1961, 1968, 1969, 1970.

Crest, motto and uniform
The College colours are Cerise and Blue. The Latin motto “Age Quod Agis” when translated reads “Whatever you do, do it wholeheartedly and well”. There are two symbols on the shield. On the left the Marist “M”, the international crest of the Marist Brothers order. On the right are an open book and a torch, the symbols of learning.

Uniform
Standard school uniform for juniors is a blue shirt, blue jumper with school logo, blue and cerise striped tie. For senior it is a white shirt, blue tie with centrally placed school crest, and a blue blazer with cerise trim.

Football uniforms for all divisions except the 1sts are a blue jersey with cerise large horizontal bar with two smaller bars.  For the 1sts a white jersey with a blue and cerise horizontal stripe through the middle (first used during the 1960s and used initially in the TAS Rugby Union competition.  The white jersey was later used by the 1sts in Rugby League competition.  The 1st grade were affectionately known as “The White Knights”).

For athletics cerise and blue vertical stripes were used on the singlets.

Notable alumni

Religion
 Bishop John Joseph Gerry (1927–2017), Catholic priest, Auxiliary Bishop for Brisbane.

Rhodes Scholars
Colin Apelt - 1954 - went to Marist Rosalie and then St Joseph's Gregory Terrace for senior
 Dan Crowley (Rhodes Scholar - 1987)

Entertainment and the arts
 Br Frank McGrath - Marist Brother and author. Br McGrath has written "John Henry Newman: Universal Revelation"(1998), "The Letters and Diaries of John Henry Newman: Volume IX: Littlemore and the Parting of Friends May 1842-October 1843 (Newman Letters & Diaries)"(with Gerard Tracey 2006), "The Letters and Diaries of John Henry Newman, Vol. 32: Supplement" (with Gerard Tracey 2009), "John Henry Newman Sermons 1824-1843: Volume III: Sermons and Lectures for Saint's Days and Holy Days and General Theology (John Henry Newman Sermons Series)"(2010), "John Henry Newman Sermons 1824-1843: Volume IV: The Church and Miscellaneous Sermons at St Mary's and Littlemore"(2011)
 Peter Coman (Author) - Author of "The Paddo Boys -  A baby boomer’s journey through the Seventies" (Zeus Publications, 2017). Peter Coman was raised in Paddington. His book is a memoir, in part, about growing up in the Paddington working class milieu of the 1960s and 1970s.
 Dr Joel Hodge - Theologian, author - "Resisting Violence and Victimisation: Christian Faith and Solidarity in East Timor" (2012) and Hodge, Joel, Cowdell, Scott and Fleming, Chris (eds), Violence, Desire and the Sacred: Girard’s Mimetic Theory Across the Disciplines (2012)
 The Headstones (Australian band) - four members were students at Marist Rosalie.
 Michael O'Rourke (Australian award-winning country singer songwriter)
 Peter de Hesse - guitarist for legendary Brisbane punk band, La Fetts.
 Jim Hooper aka Jim Diamond of Jim Diamond and the Lancers - Brisbane Rock 'n' Roll and Beat band of the 1960s and 1970s

Media
 Antony Funnell (Walkley Awards-winning journalist, broadcaster (currently on ABC Radio National) and author of "The Future and Related Nonsense" (2012))
 Frank Bellet (1931–2012) - Radio announcer, letter writer and MBE recipient (1980)
 Alan Thomas - Queensland Radio and Television Race caller, Boxing commentator, Rugby League and Cricket caller
 Tom Mitchell - Sports Editor at Nine Network Brisbane, Sideline Commentator for Suncorp Super Netball 
Peter Fegan - News Reporter at 7 News Sydney, Sunrise Reporter at 7 West Media 
Patrick Tennison - journalist, former president of the Melbourne Press Club
Noel Tennison (1931–2017) -  journalist, public relations, raconteur, writer, former president of the Melbourne Press Club. Author of "My Spin in PR" (2008), The Life of Every Party (2015). Went to Marist Brothers Rosalie before finishing off his education at Marist College Ashgrove.

Politics
Santo Santoro (Liberal Party state parliamentarian Queensland, Member for Merthyr, Liberal Party senator for Queensland)
 Kev Hooper (Labor Party state parliamentarian Queensland, Member for Archerfield)
 Dr John Flynn (Labor Party state parliamentarian Queensland, Member for Toowoomba North)
Peter Connolly (Australian judge) Hon. Mr Justice Peter Connolly - QC, Judge of the Supreme Court of Queensland 1977-1990. The elected member (Liberal Party) of the Legislative Assembly for Kurilpa 1957 to 1960. (Justice Connolly went to Marist Rosalie until 1934 before winning a scholarship to St Joseph’s College, Gregory Terrace, where he was both Dux and Head Boy in his final year in 1936)

Law
Peter Connolly (Australian judge) Hon. Mr Justice Peter Connolly - QC, Judge of the Supreme Court of Queensland 1977–1990. The elected member (Liberal Party) of the Legislative Assembly for Kurilpa 1957 to 1960. (Justice Connolly went to Marist Rosalie until 1934 before winning a scholarship to St Joseph’s College, Gregory Terrace, where he was both Dux and Head Boy in his final year in 1936)
 His Honour Judge Bernard Michael McLoughlin (Judge, District Court of Queensland 1968-1987)
 His Honour Cornelius Francis McLoughlin (Judge, District Court of Queensland 1972-1988)
 Scott Rush (convicted drug smuggler and member of Bali 9 - for the last two years of his schooling after attending and being expelled from St Laurence's College in South Brisbane) 2003

Business and work
Barry Maranta (educator, businessman, sports management, co-founder of the Australian-based Brisbane Broncos rugby league team)
 Michael Hawkins (management consultant / law) - current (2016) chairman APSA (Asia Pacific Screen Awards) and the Brisbane Asia Pacific Film Festival, Director of Screen Australia and Creative Content Australia Ltd, Executive Director of the National Association of Cinema Operators, Member (part-time) of the Administrative Appeals Tribunal (Brisbane), he serves on the Foundation of the Queensland State Library. He was formerly CEO of Australian Multiplex Cinemas Ltd and Deputy Chair of Screen Queensland. He is a lawyer by training and a Fellow of the Australian Institute of Company Directors.
John Kearney (1943–2013) ("Mr Telecommunications" - Australian computer and communications pioneer)
Harry F. Judge (1922–2008) (Surveyor and Author) He wrote "Some Tales about Measuring the Snowy Mountains" (2014) (a memoir, inter dispersed with images, maps and historic references about surveying and the journey of the first survey team in the Australian Snowy Mountains Hydro Electric Scheme in the early 1950s).
Merv Cooper (Bookmaker)

Science
 Keith Cokley (1921-2003) - scientist (timber).

Military
Terence John Corkran (1916–2006)- Pilot Officer, No. 120 Squadron (RAF), first RAAF pilot to receive the Military Cross during World War 2.
Vincent McCosker (1923–1987) - Medical Orderly with the Australian Infantry Forces during World War 2. One of the 64 survivors on the Australian Hospital Ship AHS Centaur, a hospital ship which was torpedoed and sunk by a Japanese submarine off the coast of Queensland, Australia, on 14 May 1943. Of the 332 medical personnel and civilian crew aboard, 268 died, including 63 of the 65 army personnel.

Sport
Hector Hogan (Athletics) Sprinter, Olympic medalist, 1956 Melbourne games
Stan Pilecki (Rugby Union)(Australian Team Rugby Union Captain 1970s–1980s
Kent Warbrooke (Rugby Union) 1960s, Queensland representative
Peter Dawson (Rugby Union) 1960s, Queensland representative
Barry Brown (Rugby Union) 1960s, Queensland representative
Greg Galligan (Rugby Union) 1960s, Queensland representative
Ed O'Donoghue ( Rugby Union) Queensland representative (2000s), Leinster Rugby (2010– )
Poutasi Luafutu (Rugby Union) Queensland representative (2008– )
Bernard Pease (Rugby League) Australian representative (1951)
Reg Cannon (Rugby League) 1960s / 1970s, Queensland representative
Barry Dowling (Rugby League) 1960s / 1970s, Queensland representative
John Bourke (Rugby League) 1960s / 1970s, Queensland representative
Paul Harman (Karate) 1953, Australian Karate National Champion
Warren Moon (Australian A grade Football / Soccer player )
Michael Victor (cycling) Twelve Queensland cycling titles (1958–1966), national championship medals (1960s). As an Administrator, Manager (1975) Australian team, officiated at the 1978 Edmonton Commonwealth Games, director of Cycling at the 1982 Brisbane Commonwealth Games, Commissaire, two Olympic Games, seven Commonwealth Games (1 as Chief Commissaire), Brisbane 1982 Commonwealth Games as Competition Manager (volunteer), Melbourne 2006 Commonwealth Games as Competition Manager, 7 World Championships, Chief Commissaire at 1991 South East Asian Games, Cycling Competition Manager for the 2001 Goodwill Games, Chief Commissaire at numerous UCI International events in Australia, New Zealand and Japan. Mike has been CEO of Cycling Queensland, President of Cycling Queensland, General Secretary of Oceania Cycling Confederation, Australian Team Manager to the 1975 Road and Track World Championships, Executive and Board member of Cycling Australia for 21 years, Chairman of the CA Technical Commission for two decades, President of Cycling Australia 2000 to 2009, Member of the Organising Committees for the 1994 and 2002 Junior Track World Championships and for the 1997 and 2004 Track World Championships, Member of the Advisory Committee organising the 2010 Road World Championships and member of the Operations Sub Committee for that event.
Alan Gibbard (boxing) QLD Boxing Champion 1940s-1960s 
Brett "The Butcher" Zanchetta (kickboxing) A former (2006) world number two muay thai kick boxer in the 95 kg Heavyweight division
Bernard Delaney (swimming) Queensland Breastroke champion, 1960s.

References
Marist Brothers Rosalie Silver Jubilee Yearbook, Marist Brothers, Brisbane, 1979.
Westside News, Quest Community Newspaper.
Ferrier, P, `The Golden Period Of Catholic Progress: Archdiocese Of Brisbane 1912-1927`, B Arch, University Of Queensland, 1986.
Hunt, Br Anthony, “A Short History of Marist College Rosalie”
Buckberry, Dawn (ed.) 1999, Padd, Paddo, Paddington - An Oral History of Early Paddington - Living Memories from the Heart of Brisbane, Paddington History Group, Brisbane.

External links

 http://users.tpg.com.au/canns/
 https://www.facebook.com/Marist-College-Rosalie-Old-Boys-Association-2119046905007000/
 https://www.facebook.com/pages/Marist-Brothers-College-Rosalie/145598048830772?ref=br_rs
 https://www.facebook.com/groups/122289407996/
 https://rosalieoldboys.com.au/

General
 https://web.archive.org/web/20081011052902/http://www.rosaboys.com/
 http://users.tpg.com.au/canns/
 https://web.archive.org/web/20070829054459/http://maristrosalie.com.au/Portals/0/Microsoft%20Word%20-%20Term%202%20Week%207.swf
 https://web.archive.org/web/20070831010238/http://www.parishes.bne.catholic.net.au/jubilee/churches.htm#Rosalie
 https://web.archive.org/web/20070830202454/http://parishes.bne.catholic.net.au/central/History.htm
 <b
 https://web.archive.org/web/20091027032333/http://rel-ed.acu.edu.au/mre/cdrom/charter_brisbane_catholic_education_centre.htm

Recent events
 https://web.archive.org/web/20090112025307/http://www.rosaboys.com/Print_Media_CM.htm
 http://www.cathnews.com/news/607/20.php
 http://www.Catholicleader.com.au/index.php?id=3136
 http://catholicleader.com.au/index.php?id=3140
 http://users.tpg.com.au/canns/Documents/Discussion%20Paper_Full.pdf
 https://web.archive.org/web/20071012024338/http://www.cathnews.com/news/709/96.php
 http://www.news.com.au/couriermail/story/0,23739,22093285-27537,00.html
 http://www.questnews.com.au/article/2007/09/25/20683_wn_news.html
 http://www.bernieripoll.com.au/page/56/default.asp

Notable alumni
 https://web.archive.org/web/20060917173432/http://www.qldbar.asn.au/QBN_Dec_2005.pdf
 http://hhlm.blogspot.com/search/label/Rosalie
 http://www.racingandsports.com.au/features.asp?f=newmarket04-racecallers
 http://www.abc.net.au/rn/mediareport/about/
 http://www.news.com.au/couriermail/story/0,23739,20376446-5003411,00.html
 http://www.hearsay.org.au/index.php?option=com_content&task=view&id=110&Itemid=1
 http://www.couriermail.com.au/news/opinion/hec-hogan-was-the-worlds-fastest-man-but-then-stepped-quietly-into-history-leaving-almost-no-trace/news-story/ef8da0c49279f5be9eb190695fde08a9

Private schools in Brisbane
Educational institutions established in 1929
Paddington, Queensland
Rosalie, Queensland
Association of Marist Schools of Australia
Defunct schools in Queensland
1929 establishments in Australia